South West 9 is a 2001 British film about the Brixton rave scene. It was written and directed by Richard Parry.

South West 9 was nominated for a BAFTA award and won "Best Music" category at the British Independent Film Awards.

Premise
South West 9 takes place in the 24 hours before a shooting at a Brixton rave. It combines themes of drugs, race, class, religion, and music in the multicultural melting pot that is South London.

Cast
 Wil Johnson as Freddy
 Stuart Laing as Jake
 Mark Letheren as Mitch
 Amelia Curtis as Kat
 Orlessa Edwards as Helen
 Nicola Stapleton as Sal
 Frank Harper as Douser
 Zebida Gardener-Sharper as Rafaela
 Jenny Jules as Angel
 Kika Mirylees as Annie
 Jay Simpson as Elf
 Stephen Lord as Fazer
 Leon Herbert as Isi
 Robbie Gee as Jel
 Ellen Thomas as Mrs. Ashware

Awards and nominations
2001: Won "Best Music" category, British Independent Film Awards and was nominated in five other categories, including "Best British independent film" and "Douglas Hickox" for Parry's directing.
2001: Won "Best New European director" at Odense International Film Festival, Odense, Denmark
2002: Nominated for "Carl Foreman Award for Special Achievement by a British Director, Writer or Producer in their First Feature Film in 2002", BAFTA

See also
 Human Traffic
 Groove
 Go

References

External links
 
 

Vertigo Films films
2000s English-language films